Macdonald Hotels Ltd, formed in 1990 by Donald Macdonald, is a 3.7 star hotel company based in Bathgate, West Lothian, Scotland.

Its main subsidiary, Macdonald Hotels and Resorts, owns or operates hotels and holiday resorts in the UK and Spain.

History 
In 1990, Managing Director of Stakis hotels, Donald Macdonald, created Macdonald Hotels Ltd by purchasing two Scottish hotels. The company continued to grow through various acquisitions, including hotels formerly owned by De Vere hotels and The Rank Organisation, as well as managing resorts in Spain under time-share, through a contract with Barratt Developments. 

Macdonald Hotels was bought from shareholders by its management in 2003 in a management buyout facilitated by Bank of Scotland. The value of the transaction was £590 million.
It expanded rapidly with the purchase of some "Forte Heritage Hotels" from Forte Hotels after the latter's takeover by Granada plc.
In March 2005 the company reported a 600% web revenue increase, owing the tangible increase to a new online marketing strategy. In 2007 the company sold 24 hotels to Moorfield Real Estate Fund. It subsequently bid for the Management Contract to continue running these hotels but lost out to AccorHotels.

List of hotels

References

External links
 Company website
 Macdonald Resorts website
 The Scotsman Topic devoted to Macdonald Hotels

Hotel chains in the United Kingdom